The Hengshan Calligraphy Art Center is a branch of Taoyuan Museum of Fine Arts, located in Dayuan District, Taoyuan, Taiwan. Its location is in close proximity to Linghang metro station. Construction of the art center began in September 2017 and it started trial operations on 22 October 2021.

Facilities
It is the first official art museum in Taiwan with the theme of calligraphy. The architect is Tianyi Pan. The design of the pavilion area is based on the imagery of the park as the inkstone and the pond as the inkwell. The exterior of the building is in the form of seals, consisting of five square boxes from left to right.

See also
 List of tourist attractions in Taiwan

References

External links
 

2021 establishments in Taiwan
Art centers in Taoyuan City
Art galleries established in 2021
Taiwanese calligraphy